"Waiting for the Barbarians" (Περιμένοντας τοὺς Bαρβάρους) is a Greek poem by Constantine P. Cavafy. It was written in November 1898 and printed around December 1904, as a private pamphlet. This poem falls under the umbrella of historical poems Cavafy created in his anthology.

Story
This poem is one of Cavafy’s most important works, the poem describes a city-state in decline, whose population and legislators are waiting for the arrival of the “Barbarians”. When night falls, the barbarians have not arrived. The poem ends: “What is to become of us without Barbarians? Those people were a solution of a sort.” The poem heavily influenced books like The Tartar Steppe, Waiting for the Barbarians (Coetzee), and The Opposing Shore.

The questions stated in the poem are all in fifteen-syllable lines, whilst the answers mostly occur in twelve-syllable - sometimes thirteen-syllable - lines. The conclusion is in thirteen-syllable lines. According to the poet himself, Cavafy said that the barbarians are a symbol in this work; “the emperor, the senators and the orators are not necessarily Roman.”

Excerpt

History
The poem was written in November 1898 and first published in 1904. It has since been translated into several languages and has inspired numerous other works. Daniel Mendelsohn (one of many translators who has produced an English version of "Waiting") has said that the poem's portrayal of a state whose lawmakers sit in stagnant idleness was "particularly prescient" in light of the United States federal government shutdown of 2013.

Robert Pinsky has described it as "cunning" and "amusing". Charles Simić has called it "an apt description of any state that needs enemies, real or imaginary, as a perpetual excuse", while the Independent considered the poem's final line evocative of "the dangers implied by the end of the Cold War".

Homages
J. M. Coetzee's 1980 novel Waiting for the Barbarians is named for the poem, as are Waiting for the Barbarians, the 1998 essay collection by Lewis H. Lapham and Waiting for the Barbarians, the 2013 essay collection by Daniel Mendelsohn. American composer Philip Glass has also written an opera of the same name based on the Coetzee novel which premiered in September 2005 at Theater Erfurt, Germany.

Peter Carey's 1981 novel Bliss sees Lucy's young Communist boyfriend Kenneth quoting the first stanza directly from John Mavrogordato's translation. 

Anaal Nathrakh's 2006 album Eschaton has a song named after the poem. 

Await Barbarians, the 2014 album by Alexis Taylor, is also named for the poem; similarly, that album's song "Without a Crutch" alludes directly to it.

In 2011, Andrew Ford adapted the poem into a choral work. In 2012, Constantine Koukias adapted it into an opera, "The Barbarians".

References

External links
Waiting for the Barbarians in the original Greek, at the Cavafy Archive
Waiting for the Barbarians, translated into English by Edmund Keeley and Philip Sherrard
Waiting for the Barbarians, translated into English by John Cavafy
Waiting for the Barbarians, translated into English by Stratis Haviaras

1904 poems
Poems by Constantine P. Cavafy